Matthew William Cepicky (born November 10, 1977) is a former Major League Baseball outfielder. He played for the Montreal Expos / Washington Nationals and Florida Marlins between 2002 and 2006.

Amateur career
A native of St. Louis, Missouri, Cepicky attended St. John Vianney High School and Missouri State University. In 1998, he played collegiate summer baseball with the Chatham A's of the Cape Cod Baseball League, where he was named a league all-star, helped lead Chatham to a league championship, and was named co-MVP of the league's playoffs. Cepicky was selected by the Expos in the 4th round of the 1999 MLB Draft.

Professional career
In , he signed with the Marlins as a free agent, and appeared in nine games with the big league club. In , he signed as a free agent with the Baltimore Orioles, and played for their Double-A affiliate, the Bowie Baysox, and Triple-A affiliate, the Norfolk Tides.

References

External links

1977 births
Living people
Águilas Cibaeñas players
American expatriate baseball players in the Dominican Republic
Albuquerque Isotopes players
All-American college baseball players
American expatriate baseball players in Canada
Baseball players from Missouri
Chatham Anglers players
Edmonton Trappers players
Florida Marlins players
Harrisburg Senators players
Jupiter Hammerheads players
Major League Baseball left fielders
Missouri State Bears baseball players
Montreal Expos players
New Orleans Zephyrs players
Norfolk Tides players
Vermont Expos players
Washington Nationals players
Waterloo Bucks players